Samsun Stadium, officially the new Samsun 19 Mayıs Stadium, is a football stadium in Tekkeköy, Samsun, Turkey. It was opened in 2017 with a seating capacity of 33,919 spectators. It is the new home ground of Samsunspor which plays in the TFF First League. It replaced the club's former home ground, the old Samsun 19 Mayıs Stadium (at a different location), which was demolished in 2018. The first official match hosted by the stadium was the 2017 Turkish Super Cup final.

The 2023 Turkey–Syria earthquake, located in faraway Gaziantep Province caused minor damage to the stadium.

References

Tekkeköy
Football venues in Turkey
Sports venues in Samsun
Multi-purpose stadiums
Sports venues completed in 2017
Samsunspor
Buildings damaged by the 2023 Turkey–Syria earthquake